{{DISPLAYTITLE:C7H6N2}}
The molecular formula C7H6N2 may refer to:
 Benzimidazole, a heterocyclic aromatic organic compound and colorless solid
 Indazole (also called isoindazole), a heterocyclic aromatic organic compound
 Phenyldiazomethane, (Diazomethyl)benzene